Vivian Chow Wai-man (born 10 November 1967) is a Hong Kong-based Cantopop singer-songwriter and actress.

Life and career

Vivian Chow is the only child in her family. Her father died before her birth due to heart disease. She was brought up by her mother and grandmother. Chow graduated from St. Stephen's Church College and gained 6th grade in piano.

Born and raised in Hong Kong, Chow entered the New Talent Singing Awards which held by TVB and Capital Artists in 1985. She began her singing and acting career by becoming the first runner-up at a freelance DJ competition held by RTHK in 1986.

Sancity Record (1988–1991) 
In 1988, Chow was invited by TVB to hosted the TV music program Jade Solid Gold.  Chow starred in her first movie Heart to Heart and was nominated for "Best New Performer" of Hong Kong Film Awards for her role in this movie. Chow also joined Sancity Record in the same year and released her debut platinum single, "Vivian", which got a platinum award.

Chow won "Best New Prospect Exceptional Award" of Top 10 Gold Songs Award in 1989. Later, she hosted the young-oriented current-affairs program "Modern Era" of RTHK Television with Joe Nieh.

In 1990, Chow acted in her first TV drama The Hunter's Prey and released her first and second solo album Vivian and "情迷".

Polygram (1991–1992) 
Chow resigned from RTHK and started to focus on her career as a singer and actress in 1991. Chow joined Polygram and released her third Cantonese album "A Long and Lasting Love" in November.

In 1992, Chow was named as one of "Ten Artists with Healthy Image" by Commercial Radio Hong Kong. Her fourth and fifth Cantonese album Endless Dream and Winter Romance were released in the same year.

Polygram + Linfair (1992–1996) 
Chow joined Linfair Record Taiwan and broke into the Taiwan market with releasing her song "Rumor" successfully in 1992. Her first Mandarin debut album "Rumor" was released in November and sold a total of more than 300,000 copies.

In 1993, Chow won 3rd place in the "Next Magazine TV Awards for Most Popular Artists" (first place of female artists) for her role on the TV drama The Greed of Man. Her second Mandarin album was released in May and got 6 platinum awards. Chow was chosen as the "Most Popular Female Artist" by Taiwan media. Later, Chow released her sixth Cantonese album "Most Love" which got double platinum award. The Cantonese featured album and the third Mandarin album Vivian & Her Mind were released in the end of year. Chow won Metro Hit Radio's "Best Female Singer-Bronze Award" and Japan NHK's "Most Popular Foreign Female Singer Award".
Chow released her Japanese debut album Love Legend to broke into the Japanese market in April 1994. At the same month, Chow released her seventh Cantonese album Growing up. The fourth Mandarin album Leaving the habit of depression, eighth Cantonese album The time of red leaves drifting and Mandarin compilation album Know yourself and your enemies were also released in this year. Chow got a breakthrough in her singer career for the total selling of these Cantonese and Mandarin albums got 8 platinum awards. She was also awarded the "Most Popular Hong Kong Female Singer Award" by Japanese media.

Chow's Taiwan concert tour started at ChangHua Stadium on 11 June 1994, and continued at KaoHsiung Stadium on June 18, 1994, and Taipei Stadium on 25 June 1994. Chow returned to Hong Kong in the second half of the year, she holds 4 shows in Hong Kong Coliseum at Oct 7–8 and 14–15.

In 1995, Chow won the award of "TVB JSG Top Ten 94 New Generation Performance (Silver)". She released her ninth Cantonese debut album A little more love in May. Her first Japanese EP was released in June. The Japanese duet "今を抱きしめて", sung with Japanese singer Asaku Yoshida, was also included in the Japanese EP and the Fifth Mandarin debut album "處處留情" which was released in July. Chow was named as one of "Asian Pop Divas" by Japanese music critics along with Faye Wong, Sandy Lam and Sally Yip and one of the "Top 10 Most Popular Performers" in China.

In 1996, Chow released her last Cantonese debut album "熱敏" in May, last Mandarin debut album Time in October and the first Mandarin featured album "周慧敏的敏感地帶" in December before her semi-retirement. She has also been elected as one of the "Top 10 worldwide celebrities on the Internet" by internet users.

Polygram + Taurus Records (1997–1998) 
Chow joined Taurus Records in 1997 and released the second EP "逢いにゆきたいの" in February. She was voted as one of "Top 10 celebrities on the internet" (The #1 Chinese celebrity on the poll results). After Chow announced she would not take any entertainment jobs when she held the concert in Atlantic City in November, Polygram Hong Kong released the featured album "回憶從今天開始" which included the new song "男女之間", Japanese song "逢いにゆきたいの" and 15 Chow's Hit Songs to summarize Chow's music.

At the beginning of 1998, Taurus Records released the Japanese version of the featured album "あの日から始まった", included 18 Chow's 18 best hits including "自動自覺" and "真愛在明天".

Semi-retirement (1998–2003) 
After leaving the entertainment scene, Chow moved to Vancouver with Joe Nieh and appeared in public places occasionally. She is obsessed with painting, writing and playing pool. Her painting "Old Man from San Geung" and "Looking Towards the Future" won many painting awards.

Chow and Nieh returned to Hong Kong with their cats in 2003 because the outbreak of SARS stopped them from returning to Canada. Chow revealed the reason she stopped her entertainment career in 1997 in TVB talk show "Queen’s Feast".  "My TV, movie, agency and record contracts all expired in 1997, so she tried to gain life experiences outside of the entertainment and music industries.

Back to stage (2004–) 
In 2004, Chow launched her first book My Cat Son Pal Chow which quickly sold more than 20,000 books and was also in the top 10 best-selling books for several months. Chow was also invited to be Shiseido spokesperson for the Asia region in the same year. After back to entertainment scene, Chow works as part-time and obsesses with community services. She worked with World Vision Hong Kong, Oxfam, Hong Kong Aid Foundation, Cancer Fund, Society for Abandoned Animals Limited (SAA) and Non-Profit Making Veterinary Service Society (NPV) to promote taking care of the social vulnerable group through her social influence.

Chow returned to the Hong Kong Coliseum to perform in her "Back for Love" concert on 25–27 May 2006 after she stepped on this stage twelve years ago. She
donated all of the rewards she got for the 3 concerts to NPV to raise money for establishing a veterinary clinic which grand opened on Chow's birthday in the same year.

25th anniversary of debut (2011–2013) 
Chow held the concert "Deep V.25" on 19–20 March 2011 at Hong Kong Coliseum and released the anniversary EP "Potted Plants" to celebrate her 25th anniversary of debut. The appearance of Sean Lau in the concert surprised Chow and the audiences because it was the first reunion of this pair of main characters in famous TV drama The Greed of Man. 
It was a few days after Fukushima Daiichi nuclear disaster and 2011 Tōhoku earthquake and tsunami, when Yoshie Kashiwabara came to Hong Kong as one of her special guests, Chow also decided to sell her CD's and the souvenirs designed by Leo Ku, with all proceeds given to charity for the Japanese Relief Funds. Chow's cat sons Pal Chow and Chu Jai were passed away a month before the concert.

After the concert in Hong Kong, Chow started the world tour "Vivian Chow Journey of Love".

In 2013, Chow started her own talent agency, V Vision Workshop Limited. Her agent is Lorraine Chan (Leo Ku's wife) a talent agent.

Film and gospel album (2014–) 
In 2014, Chow starred in Taiwanese movie Cafe. Waiting. Love which was released on 15 August 2014 in Hong Kong and Taiwan. The movie had a positive reception in both places. The box office reached 20 million in Hong Kong and 200 million in Taiwan. Chow was invited to sing the theme song "咖啡在等一個人" which was included in the movie soundtrack.

Chow's first gospel album HIM was released on 18 December 2014. The album was produced by Chow and issued by Emperor Group Music and Linfair Record Limited. The English song "A Love Like This" was composed by Chow is about how her faith changed her life. Chow started to participate in different forms of sermons to share Christian testimony after the album's release.

Personal life 
Chow's first love was her high school colleague. She started a relationship with the vocalist of Raidas, Chan Duk Cheung, when she worked in RTHK. This lasted for a few years. Later, Chow met Joe Nieh, the son of famous novelist Ni Kuang in a RTHK television programme in 1989 and they parted amicably in 1992. Chow met Ka Sen when she was in a Kao advertising shooting. After a two-year long-distance relationship, they broke up in 1995. Chow and Joe Nieh were back together in 1997 and married on 5 January 2009. They both become Christians in 2010 and joined an English-speaking local church in Hong Kong.

Filmography

Television (TVB)

Television (Taiwan)

Film 
Based on the title name in Cantonese:

Television film

Musical television film

Special Edition (TV)

Radio drama

Radio DJ／TV show host

RTHK

TVB

TV show

Discography

Album

Painting 
 2001: Chow's painting "Old Man from San Geung" won the "New Vision Award" in the "New Vision: Water Based Media Painting" exhibition.
 2002: Water-color painting "Looking Towards the Future" was selected to be in the first "China Water Color Painting of People Exhibition"
 2002: Chow's three water-color paintings "Looking for Dreams", "Back Alley" and "The Movement of the Waves" were on display at the "Scenes of Yau Ma Tai, Tsim Sha Tsui and Mongkok – Hong Kong Water Color Painting Exhibition".
 2003: Painting "Old Home" painted in "Tai O Hut" was on displayed at the exhibition hall of Hong Kong City Hall

Advertisements

Commercials 
 1989: Lai Chi Kok Amusement Park
 1989: Isetan Store
 1990: SAMPO CD
 1990: TDK Magnetic Necklace
 1993: 蜜力歐- O Drinks
 1992–1993: Canon Printer
 1993–1996: Kao Sifone Shampoo Serie
 1994: 愛之味 Coconut Milk
 1995:  Ajinomoto
 1995: "Great News》Idol Watch
 1996: 藝詩新婚服務
 1997: Fen Huang Oatmeal  
 2004–2007: P&G Pantene Anti-hair Breakage Shampoo
 2004–2009: Shiseido Revital Serie
 2007: Phillip Wain Health & Beauty Center
 2008–2013: Elyze 
 2010: AIGLE
 2010–2015: Bestcare (China)
 2011: Neway
 2012: SuperLife Taiwan
 2013–2019: Suisse Programme
 2016–2018: Quaker Milk Powder

Public service ad and activities 
 1987–1992: (Participated in some charity activities)
 1993: "World Vivsion's FAMINE HOUR 30", Taiwan "Disaster Mitigation and Poverty Alleviation" event, Fund Raising Activity for Guangzhou Police Force, RTHK's "Solar Project" event, "Love Fills Tung Wah – Tung Wah Stars), "Give Children a Rick Dream" for fund raising for abandoned children in Taiwan, benefit concert "Warm Current Action" initiated by the Methodist Church, "Satrlight Charity Night Benefit Concert", and performed in the 25 anniversary fund raising concert for Chow's Alma Mater. St. Stephen's Church College. 
 1994: "Anti-Piracy Action" event, "Spreading Love and Joy" charity concert, "Hong Kong Warm Current Promotion Concert" for elderly Program, RTHK's "Solar Project 1994" event, "Ultimate Thousands" charity show, held 3 concerts and donated part of the ticket sales to charity organizations, "Tung Wah Charity Show", and Helping Hands Association's "Concern For the Elderly: Warm Current Action Benefit Concert".  
 1995: "Starlight Charity Night Benefit Concert", "Illumining the Light of Heart " Charity Benefit Concert, "Neighborhood Watch", Oxfam charity events as "Poverty & Wealth Banquet Star", "World Vivsion's FAMINE HOUR 30", "Anti-Piracy Fund" raising charity bazaar event, "All for One Charity Show", "Ambassador of Etiquette" for Singapore,  "Against Fraudulence by Dishonest Trader Action" in Consumer Rights and Interests Protection Organization Pledge Convention, "Po Leung Kuk’s Gala Spectacular" charity show, RTHK's "Solar Project" event, "Fighting against AIDS Action Concert" and "Tung Wah Charity Show".
 1996: "Warm Current From Hong Kong for China" as part of "Elderly Famine 8 Hours" event, RTHK's "Solar Project" event, Ultimate Thousands for the Elderly" charity show, Hong Kong Years and Days" concert to raise fund for Guangdong "Initiate Hope" education plan and "Tung Wah Charity Show" 
 1999: Chow was appointed as the ambassador for the Society for Abandoned Animals (SAA), and shot promo posters 
 2000: Chow attended SAA fundraising event 
 2002: Donated clothing for Tung Wah charity sale, visited SAA for promotional event, and Invited by RTHK to create a card for the community project "Angel of Life".
 2003: invited to be the ambassador for the "Non-Smokers' Movement of HK" and wrote a public letter to the Ex-Chief Executive Mr. Tung Chee Hwa, petitioning for the health hazards of smoking that are imposed on non-smokers. 
 2004: Donated all book royalties for "My Cat Son Pal Chow" to SAA (Society for Abandoned Animals) for their operation funds use, visited SAA again for promotional event, assisted in promoting women's American Pool game and brought about women pool fever in Hong Kong.
 2005: Named as the 'Hong Kong Smoke Free Workplace Leading Company Ambassador' and participated in activities of propagandizing the health hazards of smoking, attended Po Leung Kuk's pledging ceremony for the " Caring Elderly Services Plan" and visited elderly who lived alone, attended the "Olympian City Denmark Christmas lighting event" as a guest star and promoted gift collection plan for the children accepting aid from Po Leung Kuk.  
 2006: Attended a makeup marathon charity event for Shiseido and raised money for Po Leung Kuk's "Caring and Serving the Elderly: University Experience Plan" , donated all of the rewards she got for the 3 concerts of "Vivian Chow – Back for Love 2006" to Non-Profit making Veterinary Service Society (NPV) to raise money for establishing a veterinary clinic, the guest star at Po Leung Kuk's "Caring and Serving the Elderly: University Experience Plan" commencement ceremony, invited to be Pink Ambassador for Hong Kong Cancer Fund (HKCF) to communicate the prevention and cure information of breast cancer and to promote events of international month of breast cancer, invited to be the guest for Festival Walk Christmas lighting event and autographed on a crystal butterfly certificate for auction, the money raised from which was donated to Make-A-Wish funds to help children with foul diseases.
 2007: Invited to be Pink Ambassador again for Hong Kong Cancer Fund (HKCF) and to shoot a TV promo as well as posters to communicate the prevention and cure information of breast cancer to public, worked with World Vision again and went to Congo in Africa to visit the impoverished children and promoted the 'Child Sponsorship Program' and hosted TV program "Sponsor a Child, Make Christmas Merrier",  attended Shiseido marathon make-up fundraising activity to help raise money for Po Leung Kuk's Elderly Services, invited to be the "Innocence Ambassador" to advocate for the sorrow coaching service program of EQ Ambassador Society, invited to be the "Computer Recycling Ambassador" by Environmental Protection Department and attended the Computer Recycling Plan Start-up event, attended NPV One Year Anniversary Celebration event as a donor and the guest star.
 2008: Invited to make a presentation at the "Farewell to My Beloved Pet" event by Society for Abandoned Animals, attended the "Love My China 2008 New Entertainment Charity Stars Event" in Shanghai and received the "2008 Most Influential Charitable Star" award, invited by the HK government and Mainland affairs office to be ambassador for the campaign promoting HK citizens to register as a voter and shot a TV promo ad and posters, invited by Tobacco Control Office to be the host for tobacco control short promotional video, invited by Oxfam to be the ambassador for the China Development Fund and visited the impoverished villagers in Yunnan, China, participated in the Oxfam Rice Sale fundraising event for the Sichuan earthquake victims as Oxfam ambassador, participated in "Artistes 512 Fundraising Campaign" concert for the Sichuan earthquake victims, invited to be Pink Ambassador again for Hong Kong Cancer Fund (HKCF) for the third time and attended Pink Revolution Press Conference, attended "Pink Revolution" event co-organized by Shiseido Singapore and Cancer Fund as the special guest and Vivian's painting "The Movement of the Waves" was printed on shopping bags for charity sale, invited to be "Love and Care" Ambassador for China AIDS Initiative and went to Fuyang and Kunming, China to visit AIDS patients and to propagandize the prevention and treatment of AIDS, participated in fund-raising event for China  Education for Girls Foundation co-organized by Shiseido and United Nations Children's Fund (UNICEF), invited to be the Love Ambassador by Sowers Action and attend the "Love Soup Can Design Contest" award ceremony as the judge and award-presenting guest.
 2009: Invited by World Vision and Commercial Radio to visit Nepal as Famine Child Sponsorship Ambassador, attend the China AIDS Initiative Check Handover Ceremony as the "Love and Care" Ambassador, attend "30 Hour Famine" Closing concert as Famine Child Sponsorship Ambassador and hosted the TV program "Sponsor and Rescue Hungry Children", private donation to fund the 2nd non-profit making veterinary clinics, personal donation to imbrue the establishment for the 2nd Non-Profit making Veterinary clinic, visited orphanage in Luoyang of Henan, China to learn about the Family Anew Movement organized by the orphanage and HK CEO Foundation, invited to be the judge for "Children and Teenager T-Shirt Design Competition" by HK CEO Foundation and presented the award ceremony, participate in the photo shoot for a photo exhibition "We Unite" which was organized to raise money for AIDS Concern, attend and perform in "Artistes 88 Fund Raising Campaign" at Asia World-Expo to raise money for flood victims in Taiwan, invited to be Pink Ambassador again for Hong Kong Cancer Fund (HKCF) for the fourth time and attended the annual Pink Revolution event, invited to be the ambassador for Make-A-Wish organization and participated in check handover and the award ceremony for the event of "In Full Support of  Hong Kong 2009 East Asian Games: Cycling Charity Race, invited by Hong Kong AIDS Foundation to interview AIDS patient and write a chapter for the book "Positive Lives" as the "Love and Care" Ambassador for China AIDS Initiative, named as The Celeb who Made us Care by Cosmopolitan Hong Kong for Cosmopolitan Fun Fearless Awards 2009, attend "Hachiko: Christmas Party for Love" check handover ceremony as Non-Profit making Veterinary Service Society (NPV) donor and announced that NPV founded the Homeless Animals Medical Treatment Fund
 2010: Attended NPV's charity premier for the movie Hachi: A Dog's Tale as a donor and addressed on promoting TNR (Trap-Neuter-Return) program for homeless animals, invited by China AIDS Initiative and Hong Kong AIDS Foundation, visited Gansu, China as the "Love and Care" Ambassador and hosted the inauguration ceremony for Clinics in Jinjizhen, Qingshui county, visited Dien Bien, Vietnam as a child sponsor for the World Vision Hong Kong and hosted TV Special "Sponsor a Child, Respond to the Silence and Hunger", attended the fund raising dinner held by Hong Kong AIDS Foundation and China AIDS Initiative as the "Love and Care" Ambassador and gave a benefit performance by singing "Moonlight in Town", invited to attend the "Listen to the Children: A 30-Hour Famine Sharing Session" as a child sponsor for the World Vision Hong Kong, received an award for "Philanthropist of the Year" of JeansWest Entertainment Awards and also invited to present the "Actor/Actress of the Year" awards, attend and sing in the Fundraising TV Programme [Artistes 414 Fundraising Campaign] for the victims of the earthquake in Yushu, China.
 2011: Acting a "Chinese Love Ambassador"to attend the grand opening ceremony of 中國國際會館 and the charity dinner auction for Care in Yunnan and Disaster Areas in Japan. Vivan auctioned her personal collections in the dinner event and raised funds of HK$200,000, acting a "World Vision Child Sponsor" to attend the sharing session of Child Sponsorship in the"30-Hour Famine", acting a "Music Ambassador" to sing in a charity fundraising dinner event held at the Crossroads Global Distribution, invited to participate the dubbing of Japanese film "Wasao" in the Hong Kong version, sound interpretation of actress "Jie ji" and donated all of reward to NPV, invited by "HK Blood Foundation" to shoot a promotional video, hosted the TV special "Sponsor a child, I can do it" as a child sponsor for World Vision Hong Kong, attended the activities "charitable treatment day" held by group of Deo Derm to appeal for Africa Hunger Relief  as Elyze spokesperson and a child sponsor for World Vision Hong Kong, invited by RTHK as presenter of "Touch the heart Award"in "Gala Extraordinaire – Stage of Ability"so as to promote United Nations Convention on the Rights of Persons with Disabilities’, Visit Outer Mongolia as a child sponsor for the World Vision Hong Kong, Invited as the guest of honor to host the light-up ceremony at "New Town Plaza Starlight Garden"and also promote  to sponsor a child for World Vision Hong Kong, invited by Hong Kong AIDS Foundation as  "Love and Care"ambassador to make a speech in Musical theater at Sheung Wan Civic Centre (Theatre), hosted the TV special "Sponsor a child, gave the Life" as a child sponsor for World Vision Hong Kong, invited by the Hong Kong AIDS Foundation as "Love and Care" ambassador to sing at "20th Anniversary Charity Dinner".
 2012: Invited by HK Cancer Fund to shoot a promotional video and photo, helped The Amity Foundation China recording the theme Choral song "Strong Smile", helped The Amity Foundation China recording the encourage video "同燃童心夏令營", attended "Used Book Recycling Campaign 2012"which can help constructing new school at Shanxi China, invited as "Love and Care"ambassador to attend "Love under the sun – Shenzhen and Hong Kong Summer Camp 2012" which co-organised by the Chinese Association of STD/AIDS Prevention and Control and Hong Kong Committee for China AIDS Initiative, appointed as The 2nd of "Guangzhou voluntary Hall of Fame", "Caring Ambassador of Voluntary Service canton Fair" and "Honor consultant of Guangzhou volunteer art troupe".
 2013: Attended ACE Foundation Event to promote marine conservation, recorded theme song and music video "Everything is Possible" for Hong Kong charity SEDH Amity Foundation, invited by Medecins Sans Frontieres as principal Guest appearance at MSF Day, invited by NGO Green Monday as International Ambassador and participated in Green Monday's print advertisement as well as attending Green Monday's press conference at Hong Kong International Airport, Travelled with World Vision Hong Kong to Sri Lanka. The entire trip was filmed for TV programme to promote Child Sponsorship, as a special guest appearance at "Vivian Lai All For Love" charity concert.
 2014: Invited by Early Psychosis Foundation to shoot the 2015 Calendar
 2015: Published an articles for refugees after visited Syrian refugees in Jordan and Lebanon with World Vision Hong Kong, invited to be a performing guest for Love Foundation to support the Chinese Children, Invited to be a performing guest for "快樂玉米關愛兒童全國巡迴演唱會" in Dong Guan.
 2016:  Invited as a performing guest for Sasa with Suisse Programme Po Leung Kuk Annual Charity Ball, invited as officiating guest for "Run for Syrian Children" of the World Vision to raise awareness for Syrian children, attended "Sing To Celebrate 25th Anniversary Charity Dinner" hold by Hong Kong AIDS foundation.
 2017: Visited Kolkata India  with World Vision Hong Kong, invited by World Vision Hong Kong to shoot the campaign "We Are Sponsors" for promoting child sponsorship, invited as a performing guest for "莎莎邁向40美麗承存慈善演唱會".

Publication

Photo albums 
 1992: "Vivian Chow DREAMS"
 1993: Pocket photo album (Included in the Album "浪漫" which released in Taiwan)
 1993: "美不勝收"
 1993: "Secrets"
 1993: Pocket photo album II (Included in the Album "最愛" which released in Taiwan)
 1993: "Vivian Chow Beautiful Cares"
 1994: "周慧敏94寫真集"
 1994: "周慧敏寫真集 – 成長"
 1995: "周慧敏 – 純美的化身"

Prose

Awards and nominations 

 1986: RTHK's (Radio Television Hong Kong) DJ competition – 1st Runner up
 1988: Hong Kong Film Awards – nominated for "Best New Performer"
 1989: RTHK Top 10 Gold Songs Awards – "Best New Prospect Exceptional Award"
 1992: Metro Hit Radio Hong Kong – "Attractive lips award"
 1992: Commercial Radio Hong Kong – "Ten Artists with Healthy Image"
 1992: Metro Hits Radio Hong Kong – "Top Ten Hit Artists"
 1992: Hong Kong "Best Wife Award" (Winner)
 1993: Min Sheng Daily Taiwan – 1992 Top Ten Hong Kong Actor/Actress (Winner)
 1993: Chinatimes Taiwan – 1992 Top Ten Singers and Album (Winner)
 1993: Next Magazine TV Awards – "Most Popular Artists" (Winner)"
 1993: TVB – Jade Solid Gold The Most Popular Duet Song (Silver)
 1993: Metro Hit Radio Hong Kong – Top Hit Female Singers (Bronze)
 1993: Hong Kong "Best Wife Award" (2nd runner up)
 1993: Taiwanese Media – "Hong Kong Star Lover in the Army"
 1993: NHK Japan – "Most Popular Foreign Female Singer"
 1993: Taiwanese Media – "Most Popular Hong Kong Female Artist"
 1994: Hong Kong "Golden Rainbow Star" 
 1994: TVB Jade Solid Gold Best 10 Awards – Best Performance in New Generation (Silver)
 1994: Hong Kong "The Most Ideal Mother"
 1994: Sunday Weekly Magazine –  Best photograph sales among all the female artists
 1994: RTHK – "Ten Stars with Loving Hearts" appraisals
 1994: Commercial Radio Hong Kong – "Ten Fittest Stars"
 1994: Japanese Media – "Most Popular Hong Kong Female Singer"
 1995: Sunday Weekly Magazine –  Best photograph sales among all the female artists
 1995: Voted by middle school students – "the No. 1 Dream Girl"
 1995: Chosen as the new successor
 1995: Most popular cover characters by appearing on 15 magazines in a year
 1995: Named as one of "Asian Pop Divas" by Japanese critics along with Faye Wong and Sandy Lam
 1995: Taiwanese Media – "Top 10 Dream Girls of Military Men"
 1995: Chinese Media – "Top 10 Most Popular Performers"
 1995: Great News Taiwan – "Top Ten Star Lovers"
 1995: Japanese Media – "Kansai Pop Diva"
 1996: Apple Daily Hong Kong – The most favorite female artist under 18 and the second most favorite female artist above 18
 1996: Famous Japanese new magazine "SAPIO" – "No.1 Popular Female Pop Singer of Hong Kong" 
 1996: The first Chinese female singer appeared on the cover of Japanese popular comic magazine "SUPER JUMP"
 1996: "Top Ten Celebrities on Internet" – First ranking among Chinese artists 
 2001: Taiwanese Media – "Most Wanted for a Comeback"
 2001: Chow's painting "Old Man from San Geung" won the "New Vision Award" in the "New Vision: Water Based Media Paintings" exhibition
 2002: Chow's water-color painting "Looking at the Past, Looking Towards the Future" was selected to be the best five of Hong Kong in the first "China Water Color Painting of People Exhibition." 
 2004: Chow released her first book "My Cat Son Pal Chow," which quickly sold more than 20,000 books and was also in the top 10 best-selling books for months
 2004: Played in the "First Official Pool Billiards Team League in Hong Kong" 
 2005: Leo Ku invited Chow to sing a duet "Love too late" with him, the song became the most popular song in Karaoke for months
 2006: Voted by the readers of Cosmopolitan Magazine Hong Kong – My Favorite Spokesperson
 2006: Voted by the readers of magazine "Fashion & Beauty" – My Favorite Spokesperson
 2006: Metro Hit Radio Hong Kong – "The Best Hit Karaoke Song of 2006"  ("Love too late" – Duet Version)
 2007: Chinese fashion magazine "Good Housekeeping" – "Most Feminine Chinese Lady"
 2007: Voted by the readers of Cosmopolitan Magazine Hong Kong – My Favorite Spokesperson in "Best of The Best Beauty Awards"
 2008: Voted by the readers of More Magazine – My Favorite Brand Ambassador of Cosmetics Brands of Forever Love Beauty Awards
 2008: Shanghai Media – "Most Influential Artist for Charity in 2008"
 2009: Shiseido China confers on people who've made outstanding contribution in the domains of cosmetic & makeup, societal culture and environment the title of "Shiseido Star of City" on July 31, 2009. Vivian is given the title of "Expo Star of City" in the domain of cosmetic & makeup
 2009: Voted by the readers of Weekend Weekly – My Favorite Brand Ambassador (Elyze) of Cosmetic Service Awards
 2009: Bazaar China – "The Most Beautiful 40 years-old with Bazaar Style" in December issue 
 2009: Cosmopolitan Hong Kong – The Celeb Who Made Us Care representative person of Fun Fearless Awards 2009 in charity field 
 2010: Voted by the male readers of Esquire China – The no.1 of "The Legend of Beauty – The most beautiful Hong Kong Actress in two decades"
 2010: Beijing Media – "Philanthropist in 2010" award
 2010: Bazaar China – "The Best Face award" in September issue
 2010: Voted by Hong Kong lesbian – "Top Dream Lover"
 2010:  Voted by internet users – "The Best Wife in Town" (fourth place)
 2010: Cosmopolitan China – "Asian Charming Looks Awards" of Beauty Awards 2010
 2011: One of winner of "The 23rd of top 10 Best Dressed Personalities Award – Fashion Visionaries"
 2012: Mr. Magazine Hong Kong – "The Ten Most Attractive Woman"
 2012: Voted by Korean internet user – "the youngest face beautiful woman"
 2015: The character Chow played in the 90's famous drama "The Greed of Man" touched a lot of television viewers while the drama re-released again on TVB 
 2015: TVB Drama Awards – The Most Popular Classic Drama – "The Greed of Man"
 2015: Voted by Hong Kong internet users – "The No.1 Goddess"

References

External links 
 Vivian Chow's official website

1967 births
Living people
Actresses from Vancouver
Cantopop singer-songwriters
Hong Kong film actresses
Hong Kong emigrants to Canada
Hong Kong women singer-songwriters
Hong Kong television actresses
Mandopop singer-songwriters
Musicians from Vancouver
Naturalized citizens of Canada
New Talent Singing Awards contestants
20th-century Hong Kong actresses
20th-century Hong Kong women singers
21st-century Hong Kong actresses
21st-century Hong Kong women singers
Hong_Kong_Mandopop_singers
Hong Kong Christians
Hong Kong idols